Acaena lucida is a small plant in the Rosaceae family, which is native to southern Chile, southern Argentina and the Falkland Islands.

Taxonomy and naming
Acaena lucida was first formally described in 1789 by William Aiton, as Ancistrum lucidum, but was assigned to the genus, Acaena, by Martin Vahl in 1804.

The genus name (Acaena) is derived from the Ancient Greek word akaina meaning "thorn" or "spine", and refers to the spiny hypanthium of many species of Acaena. The specific epithet, lucida, is Latin (lucidus, -a, -um) which means "shining", "clear" or "transparent", and in this instance was used by Aiton to mean "shining".

References

External links
Acaena lucida occurrence data from GBIF

lucida
Flora of Chile
Flora of Argentina
Taxa named by Martin Vahl
Plants described in 1789